All Def Comedy is an American television series featuring stand-up comedy airing on HBO. It is produced by Russell Simmons and a continuation of Def Comedy Jam, Simmons' stand-up series on HBO airing from 1992 to 1997.

A special aired on November 12, 2016, and a six-episode season premiered on December 1, 2017 and concluded on December 29, 2017. The series was hosted by Tony Rock.

Episodes

References

External links
 

2016 American television series debuts
2017 American television series endings
2010s American stand-up comedy television series
English-language television shows
HBO original programming
Def Jam Recordings